Enamel-dentine fracture is a complete fracture of the tooth enamel and dentine without the exposure of the pulp. Pulp sensibility testing is recommended to confirm pulpal health. 
Treatment depends on how close the fracture is in relation to the pulp. If a tooth fragment is available, it can be bonded to the tooth. Otherwise, provisional treatment can be done, which the exposed dentine can be covered using glass ionomer cement or a more permanent treatment restoration using dental composite resin or other accepted restorative dental materials. If the exposed dentine is within 0.5mm of the pulp, clinically a pink appearance can be seen. This shows close proximity to the pulp. In this case, calcium hydroxide is used to place at the base and then covered with a material such as ionomer.

References

Acquired tooth disorders
Emergency medicine
Medical emergencies